House of Numbers is a 1957 American film noir, based on author Jack Finney's 1957 novel of the same name, starring Jack Palance and Barbara Lang.

In the film, Palance plays two similar-looking brothers: Bill and his younger brother Arnie Judlow. Bill is a good citizen, trying to help his ex-professional boxer  brother, Arnie, convicted of murder, escape from San Quentin State Prison to return to Arnie's wife, Ruth, played by Lang.

The movie was filmed on location at San Quentin and set in San Quentin and Mill Valley, California, then the home city of author Finney.

Plot
Arnie Judlow (Jack Palance) is an imprisoned gangster. During a prison visit, Bill Judlow, his law-abiding brother, switches places, allowing himself to be incarcerated as the real criminal walks free. Ruth Judlow (Barbara Lang), wife of one of the Judlow boys, wavers in her loyalties.

Cast
 Jack Palance as Arnie Judlow / Bill Judlow 
 Harold J. Stone as Henry Nova - Prison Guard 
 Edward Platt as The Warden 
 Barbara Lang as Mrs. Ruth Judlow 
 Frank Watkins as Brother 
 Joe Conley as Convict in line

Reception
According to MGM records the film earned $500,000 in the US and Canada and $600,000 elsewhere, resulting in a loss of $92,000.

See also
 List of American films of 1957

References

External links
 
 
 
 
 House of Numbers film review at Prisonmovies.net

1957 films
American drama films
CinemaScope films
American black-and-white films
Film noir
Films scored by André Previn
Films based on works by Jack Finney
Films based on American novels
Films about brothers
Films directed by Russell Rouse
Films set in San Quentin State Prison
Films shot in San Quentin, California
Metro-Goldwyn-Mayer films
1950s prison films
1950s English-language films
1950s American films